Empress Borjigit could refer to several empresses in the early Qing dynasty. All of them were from the Mongol Borjigit clan:

Empress Xiaoduanwen (1600–1649), first empress consort of Hong Taiji
Empress Dowager Xiaozhuang or Empress Xiaozhuangwen (1613–1688), second empress consort of Hong Taiji
Borjigit, Demoted Empress ( 17th century), first empress consort of the Shunzhi Emperor
Empress Xiaohuizhang (1641–1718), second empress consort of the Shunzhi Emperor

Borjigit